Michael S. Cederholm (born 1966) is a United States Marine Corps lieutenant general who serves as the deputy commandant for aviation. He previously commanded the 2nd Marine Aircraft Wing from 2020 to 2022.

Early life and education 
Cederholm was born at Camp Lejeune, North Carolina and raised in New Hartford, Connecticut, graduating from Northwestern Regional High School in 1984. He is the son of Roger and Silvia Cederholm. His father was a Marine Corps helicopter pilot. Cederholm is married to Rebecca Lyn Cederholm and he has five children.

Cederholm received his bachelor's degree in international politics from Wesleyan University. Cederholm played baseball and basketball in high school, attended Wesleyan on a baseball scholarship and then coached basketball at Terryville High School. After receiving his Marine Corps commission as a second lieutenant in April 1989, he attended naval flight training in Pensacola, Florida, Beeville, Texas and El Toro, California. Cederholm later earned an M.S. degree in national security strategy from the National War College.

Military career 
In May 2022, Cederholm was nominated for promotion to lieutenant general and assignment as the Deputy Commandant for Aviation of the United States Marine Corps.

References

External links

Date of birth missing (living people)
1966 births
Living people
People from Jacksonville, North Carolina
People from New Hartford, Connecticut
Wesleyan University alumni
Military personnel from Connecticut
United States Naval Aviators
National War College alumni
Recipients of the Legion of Merit
United States Marine Corps generals
Recipients of the Defense Superior Service Medal